The second-generation Honda Civic is an automobile produced by Honda from 1979 until 1983. It debuted in June 1979 with a more angular shape, increased engine power, and larger dimensions in all models. The design was closer aligned to its larger sister, the Accord and the car was generally more comfortable and sophisticated than the first generation Honda Civic.

Design

The 1300 or 1500 cc Civic engines came in cross flow and CVCC design depending on the market they were sold in. In some countries, a 1170 cc EN3 engine was available as a base option. Three transmissions were offered: a four-speed manual (on base models), a five-speed manual, a two-speed Hondamatic, and then from 1981 a three-speed automatic.

North America
In North America, the Civic 1300 and 1500 both came in base and DX versions. The latter featured a five-speed manual transmission, partial cloth seats, carpet, rear window defroster, intermittent wipers, and a cigarette lighter. The 1500 GL added radial tires, a rear window wiper/washer, tachometer, clock, and body side moldings. The base 1335 cc ("1300") CVCC engine made , while the 1488 cc ("1500") CVCC engine produced . The Civic wagon was available only with the 1500 engine in a trim similar to the DX hatchback. The two engines still utilized cylinder heads of the CVCC type as before, but the 1500 engine could no longer meet US emissions standards without the use of a small two-way catalytic converter. As such, cars with the 1500 engine required the use of unleaded fuel. The 1300 engine — still capable of using leaded gasoline — was not available in California and high-altitude areas of the United States.

Europe
The standard European market 1.3-liter model produces  while the sporting "Civic S" (only available with a five-speed manual transmission) offered  thanks to twin carburettors. The European-spec Civic 1500 also produces  but was targeted at more comfort-oriented buyers.

History
In September 1980, for model year 1981, a three-box four-door sedan debuted, as did a three-speed automatic transmission that replaced the aging two-speed unit fitted to the first generation Civic. The four-door was also marketed as the Honda Ballade in the Japanese domestic market.

A minor facelift arrived in late 1980. In early 1982, another facelift added larger plastic bumpers, a new grille and rectangular headlights.

An upscale Civic-based five-door fastback arrived, called the Honda Quint in Japan. It was marketed at a Japanese dealership sales channel called Honda Verno along with the Honda Ballade, a high luxury model based on the Civic sedan. However, even the standard 1500-cc model achieves  city, and  highway when driven , the maximum U.S. speed limit at the time (California mileage ratings).

The slogan for 1983 Civic was We Make It Simple. A restyled saloon version of this model was also sold, badged as the Ballade. This model was also made under licence by British Leyland, badged as the Triumph Acclaim, featuring new front and rear styling, as well as a revised interior.

Sporting variants
A sport-oriented Civic "CX" was introduced in 1979 in Japan and powered with 1488 cc CVCC EM engine, fitted with firmer suspension, rear stabilizer bar and 165/70R13 Michelin tires. In 1980, new grade called "CX-S" was added to the line up, this model was available with sunroof. This model has a red accent encircled the "CX-S" and set it apart from other Civics as well as a black grille and blackout paint around the window frames. In 1983, appeared another sport model for overseas with "S" badge, this has similar appearance like the Japanese "CX-S". This model was powered with two different engines. In North America, the engine was similar to Japanese "CX" model but with lower output, but in some markets it was powered with the high performance 1335 cc EN4, which was of traditional cross-flow design, and was fitted with twin Keihin CV carburettors, and the same camshaft that was fitted to the earlier first generation GL models. The twin carburettors were similar to the design used by the 1200RS models of the mid-70s, using the same intake manifold, however Honda updated the configuration by fitting twin velocity stacks to help increase bottom-end and mid-range response. The Civic "CX" was available in white and orange, while "CX-S" and "S" was available in red and black paint colours.

Notes

References 

02
Cars introduced in 1979 
1980s cars
Hatchbacks
Sedans
Cars discontinued in 1983